Carlos González is a member of the Massachusetts House of Representatives. He was sworn into office in January 2015. A resident of Springfield, Massachusetts, he was elected as a Democrat to represent the 10th Hampden district. González is president of the Massachusetts Latino Chamber of Commerce, a member of the Massachusetts Black and Latino Legislative Caucus, and a former aide to mayor Michael Albano.

In early 2023, Gonzalez made the news for the introduction of a bill to allow Massachusetts prisoners to earn time off from their sentences by donating organs or bone marrow.

See also
 2019–2020 Massachusetts legislature
 2021–2022 Massachusetts legislature

References

Democratic Party members of the Massachusetts House of Representatives
Politicians from Springfield, Massachusetts
Living people
21st-century American politicians
Year of birth missing (living people)
American politicians of Puerto Rican descent
Hispanic and Latino American state legislators in Massachusetts